Nishigoya Dam is a gravity dam located in Tochigi prefecture in Japan. The dam is used for power production. The catchment area of the dam is 286.3 km2. The dam impounds about 8  ha of land when full and can store 547 thousand cubic meters of water. The construction of the dam was started on 1962 and completed in 1963.

References

Dams in Tochigi Prefecture
1963 establishments in Japan